The 40th Infantry Regiment is an inactive infantry regiment in the United States Army.

Lineage
Constituted 15 May 1917 in the Regular Army as the 40th Infantry. Organized 20 June 1917 at Fort Snelling, Minnesota from personnel of the 36th Infantry Regiment. Joseph D. Leitch was assigned to command. Regiment assigned to the 14th Infantry Division 5 July 1918. Relieved from the 14th Division February 1919. Inactivated 1 November 1921 at Danville, West Virginia.
Allotted to the Second Corps Area 28 February 1927. Affiliated with Cornell University and organized 18 April 1930 at Ithaca, New York. Disbanded 11 November 1944.

Distinctive unit insignia
 Description
A Gold color metal and enamel device  in height consisting of a shield blazoned: Azure, the head of a wolverine erased Or; on a canton Argent a six-bastioned fort Vert charged with a mullet of the third (for the 36th Infantry).
 Symbolism
This Regiment was organized in 1917 from the 36th Infantry, shown by the canton. During World War I it was in the 14th Division, shown by the wolverine’s head, the unofficial insignia of that Division.
 Background
The distinctive unit insignia was approved on 2 March 1938. It was rescinded on 5 September 1958.

Coat of arms
Blazon
Shield: Azure, the head of a wolverine erased Or; on a canton Argent a six-bastioned fort Vert charged with a mullet of the third (for the 36th Infantry).
Crest: None
Motto None
Symbolism
 Shield: This Regiment was organized in 1917 from the 36th Infantry, shown by the canton. During World War I it was in the 14th Division, shown by the wolverine’s head, the unofficial insignia of that Division.
 Crest: None
Background: The coat of arms was approved on 29 June 1921. It was amended to correct the blazon on 23 March 1938. The insignia was rescinded on 5 September 1958.

See also
 Distinctive unit insignia

References

 Historical register and dictionary of the United States Army, from ..., Volume 1 By Francis Bernard Heitman 
 Encyclopedia of United States Army insignia and uniforms By William K. Emerson (page 51).
  lineage

External links
 http://www.history.army.mil/html/forcestruc/lineages/branches/av/default.htm

0040